José Denis Belgrano (b. Málaga, April 8, 1844 – d. February 12, 1917) was a Spanish painter.

Belgrano was given a scholarship by Carlos Larios, Marquess of Guadiaro, to study in Rome where he lived for two years. Back to Málaga, he registered at the Malaga Art School in 1868, present-day Faculty of Fine Arts of the University of Málaga, where he was a student of Bernardo Ferrándiz. After two more years in Rome in the mid-1870s, he became professor at this school in 1887.

References 

19th-century Spanish painters
19th-century Spanish male artists
Spanish male painters
20th-century Spanish painters
20th-century Spanish male artists
Academic staff of the University of Málaga
1844 births
1917 deaths